Gemophos sanguinolentus, the measle-mouth cantharus, is a species of sea snail in the family Pisaniidae.

References

Pisaniidae